Battisford Preceptory was a medieval monastic of the Knights of St John house in Suffolk, England.
The site is situated 4.5 km south of Stowmarket and 1 km west of the village of Battisford. All that remains at the site today, apart from the place-name 'St John's Manor House', are part of the moat.

After the dissolution of the order Henry VIII granted this preceptory to Andrew Judde, alderman of London in July 1543. On 18 April 1544 it was transferred by licence of alienation to Sir Richard Gresham.

References

Monasteries in Suffolk